The Bergeron diagram method is a method to evaluate the effect of a reflection on an electrical signal. This graphic method—based on the real characteristic of the line—is valid for both linear and non-linear models and helps to calculate the delay of an electromagnetic signal on an electric transmission line.

Using the Bergeron method, on the I-V characteristic chart, start from the regime point before the transition, then move along a straight line with a slope of Z0 (Z0 is the line's characteristic impedance) to the new characteristic; then move along lines with −Z0 or +Z0 slope until the new regime situation is reached.

The − value is considered always the same at every reflection because the Bergeron method is used only for first reflections.

The method was originally developed by a French hydraulic engineer, L. J. B. Bergeron, for analysing water hammer effects in hydraulic systems.

See also
 Ringing (signal)
 Signal reflection

External links
Detailed description of the Bergeron diagram method
Texas Instruments application reports AN-806 Data Transmission Lines and Their Characteristics and AN-807 Reflections: Computations and Waveforms, 2004

Telecommunications engineering